The Margaret Fuller House was the birthplace and childhood home of American transcendentalist Margaret Fuller (1810–1850). It is located at 71 Cherry Street, in the Old Cambridgeport Historic District area of Cambridge, Massachusetts, in the neighborhood now called  "The Port" (formerly known as "Area Four") (north of Massachusetts Avenue, between Central and Kendall Squares). The house is now a National Historic Landmark.

The three-story, wooden, Federal style house was built in the early 19th century, and was Fuller's home from birth until age 16. In 1902 it became the Margaret Fuller House of Cambridge, a settlement house providing information and services to help immigrants assimilate into American culture. It is now known as the Margaret Fuller Neighborhood House.

History

Fuller's parents, Timothy Fuller and Margaret Crane Fuller, were married in 1809. A few months after the wedding, they bought the three-story, Federal-style house on Cherry Street for the high price of $6,000. The couple's daughter Sarah Margaret Fuller was born in this home on May 23, 1810.

Current use
Today, the Margaret Fuller House is being used to service the public in The Port community in Cambridge. It provides a free computer lab, computer classes, a food pantry, after-school services for children, meeting room space for various activities for the public and a daytime summer camp for children. A fundraiser is held every year for the MFNH called the Sweet Soul Supper to help provide money to run these services.

The house was designated a National Historic Landmark in 1974 for its association with Fuller, whose publication of Woman in the Nineteenth Century in the 1840s has been described by her biographer Karen Antony as "the first considered statement of feminism in this country".

See also
William Brattle House – Margaret Fuller also lived in this home in Cambridge later in her life
List of National Historic Landmarks in Massachusetts
National Register of Historic Places listings in Cambridge, Massachusetts

References

External links

 Margaret Fuller Neighborhood House Official Site
 Margaret Fuller House at the National Park Service

Fuller House
National Historic Landmarks in Cambridge, Massachusetts
Houses completed in 1810
Federal architecture in Massachusetts
Historic district contributing properties in Massachusetts
History of women in Massachusetts